Sminu Jindal (born 1973) is an Indian industrialist. She is the Managing Director of Jindal SAW Limited and Founder-Chairperson of Svayam, an initiative of the Sminu Jindal Trust & India's leading accessibility rights organization. She married Mr. Indresh Batra in 2001, and they have two sons, Anav Batra and Arjan Batra. She belongs to the US$22 billion O.P. Jindal Group.

Jindal was appointed as the Managing Director of Jindal SAW Ltd. in February 2001. She also held the position of Managing Director of Hexa Tradex Ltd. from October 2011 to August 2016. She has been Chairperson of the Assocham National Council on Iron & Steel since 2007.

Early life
Sminu studied at prestigious Maharani Gayatri Devi Girls' Public School in Jaipur, Rajasthan and Presentation Convent Senior Secondary School in New Delhi before graduating in Commerce from Shri Ram College of Commerce (SRCC), New Delhi.

When she was 11, she had an accident on a drive home from Jaipur to New Delhi that left her in a wheelchair for life.

Business

Jindal joined Jindal SAW Limited as a management trainee (1 August 1992 to 30 June 1994) in one of its loss-making factories when she was 19. She was then promoted to Executive-Corporate Planning (1 July 1994 to 31 March 1995).

Jindal helped the company venture into new business areas including urban development, domestic transport, and logistics under the company's subsidiary Jindal ITF (JITF) Urban Infrastructure.

Launch of the initiative “Svayam” by SJCT

In October 2000, SJCT launched its initiative ‘Svayam’ as a web-portal.

Membership

She has been a Jury Member on the Committee for the National Awards for the Welfare of Persons with Disabilities, Govt. of India.

Awards and honours
 Women Entrepreneur of the Year 2009 Award by FICCI Ladies Organisation (FLO)
 Young Global Leaders(YGL) 2009 by World Economic Forum
 National Tourism Award of Excellence jointly with ASI in 2009
 National Tourism Award 2011-12
 Sminu Jindal was tagged as 38th Most Powerful Women in India by Fortune India Magazine in 2011
 Asia-Pacific Enterprise Leadership Award (APELA) in the category of Social Service (2012)
 L’oreal Femina Women Award in 2014
 Global Youth Icon Awards 2014,
 GAATES Award of Recognition 2016
 Jindal has been featured in Books titled as Corporate Divas, Why I failed?

References 

1973 births
Living people
Indian businesspeople in the oil industry
Businesswomen from Delhi
20th-century Indian businesspeople
Indian billionaires
Female billionaires
21st-century Indian businesspeople
20th-century Indian businesswomen
Indian disability rights activists
Disability in India
People from Hisar (city)
Shri Ram College of Commerce alumni
Delhi University alumni
Jindal family